Hieracium chloromaurum is a species of flowering plant belonging to the family Asteraceae.

Its native range is Northern and Northeastern Europe to Poland.

References

chloromaurum